Duck Family Treasure is an American reality television series from Fox that premiered in 2022 on Fox Nation, produced by Warm Springs Productions in collaboration with Tread Lively. It chronicles the metal detecting activities of Murray Crowe, Jase Robertson and Jep Robertson, with the Robertsons’ Uncle Si directing them from The Duck Call Room podcast studio at Duck Commander. The show is considered to be a follow-up to the A&E series Duck Dynasty. The show contains educational entertainment by highlighting historic sites and natural wonders, including those related to the National Park Service.

Episodes

Season 1
The first episodes were released on June 19, 2022, on Fox Nation's streaming service.
 "Always Hunting Something"
 "Welcome Home!"
 "Mrs. Ball and Mrs. Chain"
 "The Buzzards are Circling"
 "Steamboat Fever"
On June 26, 2022, the rest of the first-season episodes were made available.
 "Meteorites!"
 "Mama's Boy"
 "The Thrill of the Hunt"
 "Home of the Brave"
 "#mensnightout"

Release 
The first episode was released on VOD platform Fox Nation on June 19, 2022, and was also broadcast on Fox News. The first season was released in two batches on Fox Nation during late June 2022.

Fox Business began to syndicate the first season of the series, starting on October 20, 2022, as a part of their Fox Business Prime programming block. On October 20, 2022, during an interview on Varney & Co., Jase Robertson announced that a second season is being produced and new episodes are being recorded.

References

External links 
 
 

2020s American reality television series
2022 American television series debuts
Fox Broadcasting Company original programming
English-language television shows
Ouachita Parish, Louisiana
Robertson family
Television shows set in Louisiana